The Governor of Tula Oblast is the head of Tula Oblast, the federal subject of Russia. Governor is elected by the people of Tula Oblast for five years.

The current governor is Alexey Dyumin.

History
From 1777 to 1796 the power in the Tula Vicegerency was divided between Governors-General and Vicegerents. The highest political power was exercised by the Governors-General. They had unlimited powers and were subject exclusively to the Russian Monarch. As a rule, each Governor-General directed several regions at the same time. In charge of the Vicegerents was directly economic activities in the field.

In 1797 the Tula Governorate was formed, which was headed by the Governor appointed by the Monarch.

The Tula Oblast was formed on 26 September 1937, initially it was headed by the Chairman of the Tula Governorate Committee of RSDLP(b), then the First Secretary of the Tula Oblast Committee of the CPSU.

In 1991, the post of the Head of the Administration of Tula Oblast was established, who was appointed by the President of Russia. On 28 September 1995, a new Charter of Tula Oblast was adopted, in which the post of Head of the Administration was renamed to Governor, who was elected by the people of the Tula Oblast. At the same time, the powers of the Governor before the elections were carried out by the Head of the Administration Nikolai Sevryugin, who was appointed by the President.

The Governor was elected by direct vote in 1997 and 2001, from 2005 to 2011 the Governor was appointed by the President of Russia with the approval of the Tula Oblast Duma. Since 2016, the Governor again elected by direct vote.

List

References

 
Tula Oblast
Politics of Tula Oblast